Torquay is a town in Devon, England.

Torquay may also refer to:

Settlements

Australia
 Torquay, Queensland
 Torquay, Tasmania, the former name of Devonport, Tasmania
 Torquay, Victoria

Other places
 Torquay, Saskatchewan, Canada

Other uses
 HMS Torquay (F43), a Royal Navy frigate
 Torquay (UK Parliament constituency), a county constituency in Devon, U.K.
 Torquay railway station, a station serving the town of Torquay, Devon, U.K.
 Torquay United F.C., a football team associated with Torquay, Devon U.K.
 "Torquay", 1959 song and 1961 album by The Fireballs